Referendums in Slovakia are initiated by gathering 350,000 signatures from Slovak voters. In order to be valid, at least 50% of eligible voters must participate in the referendum. So far, only one referendum has had sufficient turnout, the 2003 Slovak European Union membership referendum, in which 52% of eligible voters cast a ballot and 92% elected to join the European Union.

List of referendums
1994 Slovak disclosure referendum
1997 Slovak referendum
1998 Slovak privatisation referendum
2000 Slovak early parliamentary elections referendum
2003 Slovak European Union membership referendum
2004 Slovak early parliamentary elections referendum
2010 Slovak political reform referendum
2015 Slovak same-sex marriage referendum

References